The 2023 Pennzoil 400 presented by Jiffy Lube was a NASCAR Cup Series race held on March 5, 2023, at Las Vegas Motor Speedway in North Las Vegas, Nevada. Contested over 271 laps -- extended from 267 laps due to an overtime finish, on the  asphalt intermediate speedway and it was the third race of the 2023 NASCAR Cup Series season.

Report

Background

Las Vegas Motor Speedway, located in Clark County, Nevada outside the Las Vegas city limits and about 15 miles northeast of the Las Vegas Strip, is a  complex of multiple tracks for motorsports racing. The complex is owned by Speedway Motorsports, Inc., which is headquartered in Charlotte, North Carolina.

Entry list
 (R) denotes rookie driver.
 (i) denotes driver who is ineligible for series driver points.

Practice

Practice results

Qualifying

Qualifying results

Race

Race results

Stage Results

Stage One
Laps: 80

Stage Two
Laps: 85

Final Stage Results

Stage Three
Laps: 102

Race statistics
 Lead changes: 13 among 8 different drivers
 Cautions/Laps: 4 for 26
 Red flags: 0
 Time of race: 2 hours, 50 minutes and 35 seconds
 Average speed:

Media

Television
Fox Sports covered their 23rd race at the Las Vegas Motor Speedway. Mike Joy, Clint Bowyer and Danica Patrick called the race in the booth for Fox. Jamie Little and Regan Smith handled the pit road duties, and Larry McReynolds provided insight from the Fox Sports studio in Charlotte.

Radio
PRN covered the radio call for the race which was also simulcasted on Sirius XM NASCAR Radio. Doug Rice and Mark Garrow called the race in the booth where the field raced through the tri-oval. Rob Albright called the race from a billboard in turn 2 where the field raced through turns 1 and 2. Pat Patterson called the race from a billboard outside of turn 3 where the field raced through turns 3 and 4. Brad Gillie, Brett McMillan, Wendy Venturini, and Heather Debeaux worked pit road for the radio side.

Standings after the race

Drivers' Championship standings

Manufacturers' Championship standings

Note: Only the first 16 positions are included for the driver standings.

Notes

References

2023 in sports in Nevada
2023 NASCAR Cup Series
March 2023 sports events in the United States
NASCAR races at Las Vegas Motor Speedway